This is a list of notable graduates as well as non-graduate former students, academic staff, and university officials of the University of Edinburgh in Scotland. It also includes those who may be considered alumni by extension, having studied at institutions that later merged with the University of Edinburgh. The university is associated with 19 Nobel Prize laureates, three Turing Award winners, an Abel Prize laureate and Fields Medallist, four Pulitzer Prize winners, three Prime Ministers of the United Kingdom, and several Olympic gold medallists.

Government and politics

Heads of state and government

United Kingdom

Cabinet and Party Leaders

Scottish Cabinet and Party Leaders

Current Members of the House of Commons
 Wendy Chamberlain, MP for North East Fife
 Joanna Cherry, MP for Edinburgh South West
 Colin Clark, MP for Gordon
 Anneliese Dodds, MP for Oxford East
 Kate Green, MP for Stretford and Urmston
 John Howell, MP for Henley
 Neil Hudson, MP for Penrith and The Border
 Danny Kruger, MP for Devizes
 Dame Eleanor Laing, MP for Epping Forest
 Steve McCabe, MP for Birmingham Selly Oak
 Stuart McDonald, MP for Cumbernauld, Kilsyth and Kirkintilloch East
 Callum McCaig, MP for Aberdeen South
 Ian Murray, MP for Edinburgh South
 Pat McFadden, MP for Wolverhampton South East
 Jerome Mayhew, MP for Broadland
 David Mundell, MP for Dumfriesshire, Clydesdale and Tweeddale
 Pete Wishart, MP for Perth and North Perthshire
 Catherine McKinnell, MP for Newcastle upon Tyne North
 Kenny MacAskill, MP for East Lothian

Current Members of the House of Lords
 James Bethell, 5th Baron Bethell, Conservative Peer
 Anne McIntosh, Baroness McIntosh of Pickering, Conservative Peer
 Kathryn Clark, Baroness Clark of Kilwinning, Labour Peer
 Lynda Clark, Baroness Clark of Calton, Labour Peer
 William Cullen, Baron Cullen of Whitekirk, Crossbench
 James Douglas-Hamilton, Baron Selkirk of Douglas, Conservative Peer
 Andrew Dunlop, Baron Dunlop, Conservative Peer
 Ruth Davidson, Baroness Davidson of Lundin Links, Conservative Peer
 Neil Davidson, Baron Davidson of Glen Clova, Labour Peer
 Murray Elder, Baron Elder, Labour Peer
 George Foulkes, Baron Foulkes of Cumnock, Labour Peer
 Peter Forster, Lord Spiritual
 David Hope, Baron Hope of Craighead, Crossbench
 Andrew Hardie, Baron Hardie, Crossbench
 Richard Keen, Baron Keen of Elie, Conservative peer
 Michael Andrew Foster Jude Kerr, 13th Marquess of Lothian, Conservative Peer
 James Lindesay-Bethune, 16th Earl of Lindsay, Conservative Peer
 James Mackay, Baron Mackay of Clashfern, Conservative Peer
 Donald Mackay, Baron Mackay of Drumadoon, Conservative peer
 Mark McInnes, Baron McInnes of Kilwinning, Conservative Peer
 Patrick McLoughlin, Baron McLoughlin, Conservative Peer
 Malcolm Offord, Baron Offord of Garvel, Conservative peer
 Adrian Palmer, 4th Baron Palmer, Crossbench
 Robert Reed, Baron Reed of Allermuir, Crossbench
 Nicol Stephen, Baron Stephen, Liberal Democrat Peer
 Keith Stewart, Baron Stewart of Dirleton, Conservative Peer
 Fiona Twycross, Baroness Twycross, Labour Peer
 Alexander Trees, Baron Trees, Crossbench
 Clifton Wrottesley, 6th Baron Wrottesley, Conservative Peer
 Jim Wallace, Baron Wallace of Tankerness, Liberal Democrat Peer
 John Woodcock, Baron Walney, Crossbench

Current Members of the Scottish Parliament
 Jeremy Balfour, MSP for Lothian
 Claire Baker, MSP for Mid Scotland and Fife
 Foysol Choudhury, MSP for Lothian
 Maggie Chapman, MSP for North East Scotland
 Katy Clark, MSP for West Scotland
 Kate Forbes, MSP for Skye, Lochaber and Badenoch
 Christine Grahame, MSP for Midlothian South, Tweeddale and Lauderdale
 Liam Kerr, MSP for North East Scotland
 Oliver Mundell, MSP for Dumfriesshire
 Fulton MacGregor, MSP for Coatbridge and Chryston
 Liam McArthur, MSP for Orkney
 Ben Macpherson, MSP for Edinburgh Northern and Leith
 Alex Rowley, MSP for Mid Scotland and Fife
 Liz Smith, MSP for Mid Scotland and Fife
 Kaukab Stewart, MSP for Glasgow Kelvin
 John Swinney, MSP for Perthshire North
 Martin Whitfield, MSP for South Scotland
 Sue Webber, MSP for Lothian

United States

Africa
 Joseph Ukel Abango, South Sudan Minister of General Education (2011-2013)
 Eustace Akwei, Ghana Minister for Health (1966-1969)
 Herbert Bankole-Bright, political activist in Sierra Leone
 Jaya Krishna Cuttaree, Mauritian Minister of Labour, Lands and Housing (1982-2000), Minister of Industry and Trade (2000-2005)
 Yusuf Dadoo, former chair of the South African Indian Congress and the South African Communist Party
 Moses Da Rocha, Nigerian doctor, journalist and politician
 Unity Dow, Botswana Minister of Foreign Affairs and International Cooperation (2019-2020), member of the National Assembly
 Patrick Duncan, 6th Governor-General of the Union of South Africa, South African Minister for the Interior, Education and Public Health (1921-1924)
 Kesaveloo Goonam, South African doctor, Indian nationalist and anti-apartheid activist
 Alex Ibru, Nigerian Minister of Internal Affairs (1993-1995)
 Omar Ali Juma, Former Vice-President of Tanzania
 Danielle de St. Jorre, Seychelles Minister of Foreign Affairs (1989-1997)
 Vedastus Kyalakishaija Kyaruzi, former Permanent Representative of Tanzania to the United Nations
 Nazir Karamagi, Tanzanian Minister of Energy and Minerals (2006-2008)
 Nelson P. W. Khonje, Speaker of the National Assembly of Malawi (1975-1987)
 Peter Msolla, Tanzanian MP
 Shettima Ali Monguno, Nigerian Federal Minister for Airforce and Internal Affairs (1965-1966), Minister for Mines, Power, Petroleum and Energy (1972-1975)
 Agnes Nyalonje, Malawi Minister of Education (2020-)
 Monty Naicker, anti-apartheid activist and leader of the South African Indian Congress
 Frederick Nanka-Bruce, Ghanaian doctor, journalist and former member of the Ghanaian Parliament
 Bandele Omoniyi, Nigerian law student and political activist
 Betty Ogwaro, South Sudanese Minister of Agriculture and Forestry (2011-2014; 2014-2015; 2016-2019)
 Sam Ongeri, Kenyan Minister for Education (2008-2012), Minister for Foreign Affairs (2012-2013)
 Imrana Alhaji Buba, Nigerian social entrepreneur and political activist
 Hae Phoofolo, interim Prime Minister of Lesotho
 Benjamin Quartey-Papafio, first Ghanaian doctor and member of the Gold Coast Legislative Council
 John K Randle, West African doctor and politician
 Richard Sezibera, Rwandan Minister of Foreign Affairs (2018-2019), 4th Secretary-General of the East African Community (2011-2016)
 Richard Akinwande Savage, Nigerian doctor, pan-African politician and newspaper editor
 Noah Wekesa, Kenyan Minister for Forestry and Wildlife (2008-2012), Minister for Education (2007), and Minister for Science (2005-2007)

Asia
 Kōichirō Asakai, Japanese ambassador to the United States and ambassador to the Philippines who oversaw the signing of U.S.-Japan Security Treaty
 Mukhtar Ahmed Ansari, Indian nationalist, President of the Indian National Congress (1927-1928)
 Lalith Athulathmudali, Sri Lankan Minister of Trade and Shipping (1977-1984)
 Harini Amarasuriya, Sri Lankan MP
 Chu Anping, Chinese journalist and political activist
 Fu Ssu-nien, linguist and historian, one of the leaders of the Chinese May Fourth Movement in 1919
 Hsu Hsin-liang, Chairman of Taiwan's Democratic Progressive Party (1996-1998), Magistrate of Taoyuan (1977-1979) and President Elect in 2000
 Sir Reginald Johnston, Puyi's tutor and advisor, last Commissioner of British Weihaiwei
 Prakash Karat, General Secretary of the Communist Party of India (Marxist) (2005-2015)
 Arbab Alamgir Khan, Pakistan Federal Minister for Communications (2012-2013)
 M. C. M. Kaleel, Sri Lankan Minister of Home Affairs (1960)
 Lim Chong Eu, 2nd Chief Minister of Penang (1969-1990) and founder of Parti Gerakan Rakyat Malaysia
 Wu Zhihui, Chinese linguist and major political figure during the Republic of China (1912–1949)
 Zhang Shizhao, Chinese journalist, educator and Minister of Justice (1924-1925) and Minister of Education (1925)

Canada

 William Johnston Almon, former Canadian Senator for Halifax
 Peter Boehm, Canadian Senator for Ontario
 Edward Borron, former MP for Algoma
 Christy Clark, 35th Premier of British Columbia
 George Ralph Richardson Cockburn, former MP for Toronto Centre
 George Alexander Drummond, former Canadian Senator for Quebec, 12th President of the Bank of Montreal
 Kirsty Duncan, MP for Etobicoke North, Deputy Leader of the Government in the House of Commons (2019-), Minister for Science (2015–2019)
 Adelbert Edward Hanna, former MP for Lanark South
 Robert James Manion, Canadian cabinet minister, Conservative Leader of the Opposition from 1938 to 1940
 Joseph Morrin, 7th and 9th Mayor of Quebec
 Sir William MacGregor, 60th Governor of Newfoundland
 Frederick Montizambert, first Director General of Public Health in Canada
 Andrew Ross McMaster, former MP for Brome and Provincial Treasurer of Quebec 
 Clarence Primrose, former Canadian Senator for Nova Scotia
 James Palmer Rankin, former Canadian Senator for Ontario
 Alexander David Stewart, former Mayor of Hamilton, Ontario
 Alexander Warburton, 7th Premier of Prince Edward Island
 Arthur Trefusis Heneage Williams, former MP and Chief Government Whip

Caribbean
 John Alcindor, Trinidadian doctor and politician
 Charles Duncan O'Neal, Barbados politician
 Edgar F. Gordon, doctor and trade union leader in Bermuda
 David Pitt, Baron Pitt of Hampstead, Grenadian politician, the first person of African descent to stand as an MP (in Britain), the second person of African descent to sit in the House of Lords

Europe

 Mina Andreeva, Chief Spokesperson for the European Commission
 Gisela Babel, former member of the German Bundestag
 Elmar Brok, former MEP for Germany, Chair of the European Parliament Committee on Foreign Affairs (1999-2007; 2012–2017) and President of the Union of European Federalists (2013-2018)
 Benjamin Constant, French politician and eminent political theorist, Member of the Tribunat (1799–1802), Member of the Council of State (1815), Member of the Chamber of Députés (1819–1830)
 Biljana Đorđević, member of the Serbian National Assembly
 Aina Calvo, former Mayoress of Palma, Spain
 Furio Honsell, former Mayor of Udine, Italy
 Jón Baldvin Hannibalsson, Icelandic Minister of Finance (1987-1988), Foreign Minister (1988-1995)
 Ögmundur Jónasson, Icelandic Minister of Health (2009) and Minister of the Interior (2011-2013)
 Hanna Birna Kristjánsdóttir, 19th Mayor of Reykjavík, Icelandic Minister of the Interior (2013-2014)
 Árni Mathiesen, Icelandic Minister of Finance (2005-2009)
 Angelika Niebler, MEP for Germany, Deputy Chairwomen for European People's Party (2015-)
 Theodoros Roussopoulos, Greek Minister of State (2004-2008)
 Gerhard Schröder (CDU), West German Federal Minister of the Interior (1953–1961), Federal Minister of Foreign Affairs (1961–1966), and Federal Minister of Defence (1966–1969), 1969 presidential candidate
 Gustaf Algernon Stierneld, Swedish Prime Minister for Foreign Affairs (1838-1840; 1848–1856)
 Péter Ungár, Member of the National Assembly of Hungary, Leader of LMP – Hungary's Green Party (2022-)
 Jerzy Żyżyński, economist and member of the Polish Sejm

Middle East
 Najah al-Attar, current Vice President of Syria
 Mehmet Aydın, Turkish Minister of State (2002-)
 Hovhannes Bujicanian, Armenian teacher in the Ottoman Empire
 Saad bin Khalid Al Jabri, Saudi Arabian Minister of State
 Abu Bakr al-Qirbi, Yemeni Minister of Foreign Affairs (2001-2014; 2016)
 Bassam Talhouni, Jordanian Minister for Justice (2013-2016)
 Hikmat Abu Zayd, first female cabinet minister of Egypt

Oceania

 Richard Arthur, New South Wales Minister for Public Health (1927-1930)
 Sir Thomas Brisbane, former Governor of New South Wales whose name gave rise to the Australian city, Brisbane
 Sir John Bowser, 26th Premier of Victoria
 Francis Bugotu, Permanent Representative of the Solomon Islands to the United Nations (1978-1992), Secretary-General of the Pacific Community (1982-1986)
 Cyril Cameron, former Australian Senator for Tasmania
 Sir Michael Cullen, former Deputy Prime Minister of New Zealand
 Sir John Logan Campbell, 17th Mayor of Auckland
 John Garland, New South Wales Minister for Justice (1909-1910; 1916–1919)
 Sir James Graham, 41st Mayor of Sydney
 John Alexander MacPherson, 7th Premier of Victoria
 Malcolm Mackay, Australian Minister for the Navy (1971-1972)
 Sir David Monro, 2nd Speaker of the New Zealand House of Representatives
 F. Russell Miller, 40th Mayor of Invercargill, New Zealand
 Sir William MacGregor, 11th Governor of Queensland
 Andrew McLachlan, Australian Senator for South Australia, Deputy President of the Australian Senate (2022-)
 Sir Hugh Nelson, 11th Premier of Queensland
 David Seath, New Zealand Minister of Internal Affairs (1963-1972)
 Carty Salmon, 2nd Speaker of the Australian House of Representatives
 Sir Alexander Stuart, 9th Premier of New South Wales
 Henry Thacker, 32nd Mayor of Christchurch, New Zealand

Royalty
 Albert, 12th Prince of Thurn and Taxis, head of the House of Thurn and Taxis
 Countess Alexandra Nikolaevna Tolstoy-Miloslavsky, member of the Tolstoy family
 Archibald Campbell, 3rd Duke of Argyll
 David Carnegie, 4th Duke of Fife
 Charles Carnegie, Earl of Southesk, heir apparent to the Dukedom of Fife
 Samuel Chatto and Arthur Chatto, sons of Elizabeth II's niece Lady Sarah Chatto
 Edward VII, King of the United Kingdom and Emperor of India
 George Percy, Earl Percy, heir apparent to the Dukedom of Northumberland
 Henry FitzRoy, 12th Duke of Grafton, direct male-line descendant of Charles II of England
 Lady Amelia Windsor, a relative of the British royal family
 Margareta of Romania, Custodian of the Crown of Romania
 Princess Mako of Akishino, member of the Imperial House of Japan
 Princess Nora of Oettingen–Spielberg, member of the House of Oettingen-Spielberg
 Princess Raiyah bint Hussein, member of the House of Hashim
 Princess Salha bint Asem, member of the House of Hashim
 Princess Tsuguko of Takamado, member of the Imperial House of Japan
 Prince Pavel Mikhailovich Dashkov, Russian aristocrat
 Louis Spencer, Viscount Althorp, heir apparent to the Spencer earldom and first cousin of the Duke of Cambridge and Prince Harry
 Bhagvat Singh, former Maharaja of the princely state of Gondal

Judges and lawyers

Military

Officers

 Ralph Abercromby , MP, Commander-in-Chief, Ireland during the Irish Rebellion of 1798
 Sir Archibald Alison, 2nd Baronet , General
 Sir Hugh Beach , General, Deputy Commander-in-Chief Field Army (1976-1977)
 Sir James Baird , Lieutenant General, Director General Army Medical Services (1973-1977)
 David Coulter , Major-General, Chaplain General of the British Army (2014-2018)
 Robert Craigie , Admiral
 Thomas Cochrane, 10th Earl of Dundonald , Naval flag officer during the Napoleonic Wars and later Admiral of the Red, dubbed by Napoleon as le Loup des Mers, 'the Sea Wolf'
 Sir Hew Whitefoord Dalrymple, General, Governor of Gibraltar (1806-1808)
 John Forbes, Brigadier-General, commanded the Forbes Expedition during the French-Indian war
 Sir Alexander Hood , Lieutenant-General, Director General Army Medical Services (1941-1948), Governor of Bermuda (1949-1955)
 John Hunter, Vice-admiral of the red, Governor of New South Wales (1795-1800)
 James Francis Edward Keith, Scottish Jacobite, served during the Seven Years' War under Frederick the Great as Generalfeldmarschall of the Prussian Army
 Daniel Knobel , Lieutenant General, Surgeon General of the South African Defence Force (1988-1997)
 William Thompson Lusk, Assistant Adjutant-General for the Union, American Civil War
 Sir James McGrigor , responsible for the creation of the Royal Army Medical Corps
 Gregor MacGregor, Army General, adventurer, and confidence trickster, known for his "Poyois scheme"
 Sir George Malcolm , General
 Sir Harold Martin , Air Marshal, Commander-in-Chief RAF Germany (1970-1973)
 Sir Ian McGeoch  , Vice-Admiral
 Iain McNicoll , Air Marshal, Deputy Commander-in-Chief Operations, RAF Air Command (2007-2010)
 Sir Charles Napier , Admiral, served in  War of 1812, the Napoleonic Wars, and the Crimean War
 Sharon Nesmith, first woman to command a British Army Brigade, Lieutenant-general and Deputy Chief of the General Staff (2021-)
 Arthur Edward Potts  , Major General, Commander of 6th Canadian Infantry Division (1942-1943)
 Philip Raffaelli , Surgeon-General of the United Kingdom Armed Forces (2009-2012)
 Andrew Rutherford, 1st Earl of Teviot, Lieutenant-General under Louis XIV when England was in Interregnum, Governor of Tangier (1663-1664)
 George Ramsay, 9th Earl of Dalhousie, Governor of Canada (1820-1828), Commander-in-Chief, India (1830-1832)
 Thomas Rimmer , Air Vice-Marshal, Commander, British Forces Cyprus (2000-2003)
 Alan Reay , Lieutenant General, Director General Army Medical Services (1981-1984)
 Sir James Simpson , General, Commander-in-Chief British troops in the Crimea (1855)
 James Stuart, General, 1st General Officer Commanding, Ceylon (1796)
 Sir Charles Shaw, Brigadier-general during the Portuguese Liberal Wars
 Adam Stephen, Scottish-American General in the Continental Army during the American Revolutionary War
 Mona Chalmers Watson , head of Women's Army Auxiliary Corps
 Bennett H. Young, Lieutenant, Confederate officer who led the St. Albans Raid during the American Civil War

Soldiers

 Eric Brown   , Royal Navy officer and test pilot who flew 487 types of aircraft, more than anyone else in history
 William Brydon , the only person to reach safety in the 1842 retreat from Kabul
 James Marr Brydone, Ship's surgeon of HMS Thunderer at Battle of Trafalgar
 Charles Gray Catto, World War I flying ace, later Mayor of Waco, Texas
 Gordon Duncan , Scottish flying ace
 James Oliver Ewart, intelligence officer, translator, and staff member of Field Marshal Bernard Montgomery
 John Todd , Scottish First World War flying ace credited with 18 aerial victories

Victoria Cross and George Cross Recipients

Victoria Cross
Crimean War
 William Henry Thomas Sylvester , Major
Indian Mutiny
 James John McLeod Innes , Lieutenant General
 Valentine McMaster , Army surgeon
Andaman Islands expedition
 Campbell Mellis Douglas , Lieutenant Colonel
Second Boer War
 Sir William Babtie , Lieutenant-General
 Henry Edward Manning Douglas , Major-General
First World War
 Allan Ker , Major
 Arthur Moore Lascelles , Captain
 David Lowe MacIntyre , Captain
 Harcus Strachan , Lieutenant Colonel
George Cross
Second World War
 Douglas Ford , Captain
 John Fraser , Major
 Sandy Hodge , Captain
 Charles Howard, 20th Earl of Suffolk , Bomb disposal expert

Natural sciences, engineering and medicine

Astronomy

Chemistry

Geology

Computer Science and Informatics

Senior Academic Staff

Former Staff and Alumni

Engineering

Mathematics and Physics

Medicine and biology

Social sciences, arts and business

Pulitzer Prize
 Ross Anderson, winner of the Pulitzer Prize for National Reporting in 1990
 Garry Wills, winner of the Pulitzer Prize for General Non-Fiction in 1993
 Jack N. Rakove, winner of the Pulitzer Prize for History in 1997
 Andrew Marshall, winner of the Pulitzer Prize for International Reporting in 2014

Architecture

Business

Economics

Literature

Media and the arts

Music

History, philosophy, sociology and theology

Others

Sports

Miscellaneous

University officials

 Sir Edward Victor Appleton, former Principal and Vice-Chancellor of the university (1949–1965)
 Edmund Allenby, 1st Viscount Allenby, former Rector of the university (1935-1936)
 Arthur Balfour, former Chancellor of the university (1891–1930)
 Stanley Baldwin, former Rector of the university (1923-1926)
 Earl Beatty, former Rector of the university (1917-1920)
 Viscount Cunningham of Hyndhope, Rector of the university (1945-1948)
 Sir Winston Churchill, former Rector of the university (1929–1932)
 Sir Alexander Fleming, former Rector of the university (1951–1953)
 David Lloyd George, former Rector of the university (1920–1923)
 William Gladstone, former Rector of the university (1859-1865)
 The Earl of Rosebery, former Rector of the university (1880-1883)
 Prince Philip, Duke of Edinburgh, former Chancellor of the university (1953–2010)
 Anne, Princess Royal, Chancellor of the university (2011–present)

See also
 List of Nobel laureates affiliated with the University of Edinburgh

Notes

References

 
 
 
Edinburgh-related lists
Edinburg